Club de Fútbol Pachuca is a Mexican professional football team based in Pachuca, Hidalgo, that competes in Liga MX. Founded by Cornish miners from Camborne and Redruth in 1901, it is one of the oldest football clubs in the Americas, and was one of the founding members of the Mexican Primera División.

After decades of mediocre seasons between the first and second divisions, Pachuca was last promoted to the Primera División in 1998. Since then, it has been one of the most successful clubs in Mexico, winning 7 national championships, 5 CONCACAF Champions' Cups, the 2007 SuperLiga, and the Copa Sudamericana. In 2006, Pachuca became the first CONCACAF team to win a CONMEBOL tournament, and is currently the only team in the world to have won a club championship in a confederation outside its own.

History

Amateur era
Emigrant miners from Cornwall in the south-west of Britain, working for the Compañía Real del Monte y Pachuca, founded the "Pachuca Athletic Club" in 1901. Originally they practiced football only as an unorganised hobby during their free time  while working at the mines owned by William Blamey. Alfred C. Crowle was the man who first introduced the sport to the Mexican mine workers, bringing the first proper footballs and explaining the rules. The game rapidly spread in popularity and other clubs soon were established in surrounding states, including Albinegros de Orizaba, Reforma AC, British Club, Puebla A.C., and Mexico Cricket Club.

On July 19, 1907, the Mexican Primera División was founded, with Pachuca as one of the league's founding members.

In the 1908 season, a Mexican born player, David Islas, appeared for the first time in the ranks of the team. From 1910 to 1912, the Mexican Revolution decimated professional football in Mexico until only three clubs remained; Pachuca being one of them. By 1915, most of the players on the team were Mexicans. From 1917 to 1920, Pachuca were league champions under British coach Alfred C. Crowle. Pachuca then went into a hiatus during the 1920–1921 season when most of its players moved to Mexico City. Many years passed by until a Mexican Second Division team were reassembled.

Professional era
In 1967 the team was crowned champion of the Segunda División and was able to move up to the Primera División. However, the team fared poorly and returned to the Segunda División in the early 1970s. The "Tuzos" would have to wait 19 years before being able to return to the Primera División in the 1992–93 season, where they would struggle to remain and were relegated at the end of that same season. The loss of prestige of the Segunda División causes a new division of play to be created. The Primera División A is created in 1994, later called Liga de Ascenso and the team is a sensation. However, they are unable to crown their efforts and fall to Atlético Celaya in an overtime final. In the 1995–96 season, the team becomes champion of the Primera "A" tournament and is promoted to the Primera División for the 1996–97 season. However, the team struggles yet again, and is relegated to the Primera División "A" once more.

After the FMF splits the calendar into two half-length tournaments, Pachuca becomes champion of the Winter tournament. After defeating the Tigrillos in the promotion final, once again, Pachuca returns to the Primera División. In the 1998–99 season, the team breaks its own bad streak with a draw against Atlante in the Estadio Azteca in front of 30,000 people and avoids returning to the Primera División "A" . Also, for the first time in 30 years they remained in the top division for two consecutive years under coach Javier Aguirre. In the Invierno 1999 tournament, Pachuca won the league title for the first time in its history, defeating Cruz Azul in the second leg of the playoff final on December 19, 1999. Javier Aguirre lead an unexpected team to victory, which culminated with a golden goal scored by Argentinian striker Alejandro Glaria. Repeatedly interviewed after the quarterfinal and semi-final matches, Aguirre declared that he never expected to get so far, and originally expected to be on vacation by that point. As a result of their conquest, the team is invited to participate in the now defunct CONMEBOL tournament, Copa Merconorte, for the 2000 edition, where they finished third in their group and failed to qualify for the knockout stages. 

With a strong effort from the organization, they manage to keep 85% of the original championship team for the following season and by 2001, the "Tuzos", again under Javier Aguirre, are finalists in the summer tournament. They fall to Santos Laguna in the Estadio Corona in Torreón, Coahuila. During that season, the team lost one of its biggest figures when Pablo Hernán Gómez was killed in a car accident on January 29, 2001. By the end of 2001, Javier Aguirre is chosen to coach the Mexico national team which found itself at risk of not qualifying for the 2002 FIFA World Cup, and the team selects Alfredo Tena to be the new coach. Tena leads the team to the 2001 Winter Tournament Finals where they face Tigres UANL in the Estadio Universitario and conquer their second league title.

2001 was also a celebration year for the team; Pachuca became the first Mexican professional football team to reach 100 years of existence. The team organized a large number of special events, among them the inauguration of a university with a curriculum that revolves entirely around football related fields called Universidad del Fútbol.  

In the Apertura 2003, the team captured yet another championship, again against Tigres UANL, and again in their stadium. This time, the coach was Víctor Manuel Vucetich.  Between 2004 and 2005 the team devoted more attention to social and marketing issues and failed to make the playoffs during two consecutive seasons. President Jesús Martínez however, vowed that the team would return to be among the headliners of the Primera División. As a result, Pachuca won the Clausura 2006 championship, beating San Luis in the finals after having an exceptional season which saw the club top the general standings table. It was the first time that Pachuca won the championship by playing the return match in its home stadium, and their fourth title in eight years.

Copa Sudamericana title: 2006 
With their 2006 title, Pachuca qualified for the 2006 Copa Sudamericana. Their first match was a 2–1 loss against Tolima in Ibagué, but at Estadio Hidalgo they had a large 5–1 victory and qualified for the next round. In the next round, they faced Lanus, where they had an excellent 3–0 victory in Argentina, before drawing 2–2 in Mexico, setting up a semi-final matchup with Athletico Paranaense, who has been the defending finalist the previous year. The first leg was played in Curitiba, where Pachuca won 1–0 with a goal from Damián Álvarez in the 86th minute. In the second leg, Pachuca began losing, but comfortably won 4–1, and advanced to the finals with an ample 5–1 aggregate scoreline. In the finals they were matched up with Colo-Colo, one of Chile's most historic and popular clubs; the first leg in Mexico finished in a draw. In the second leg at Estadio Nacional on December 14, the Chilean club scored first, but Pachuca scored two second half goals to turn the game around and win the title for the first time in its history, 3–2 on aggregate.

With the 2006 Clausura title, Pachuca qualified for the 2007 CONCACAF Champions' Cup, where they disposed of W Connection and MLS team D.C. United, before defeating Chivas Guadalajara on penalties in the final after a 2–2 draw on aggregate on April 25, 2007.

On May 27, Pachuca won their 5th domestic title in the Clausura 2007, in a final that was disputed against America; winning this championship meant Pachuca had won 4 trophies in the past 15 months, 2 domestic trophies exactly one year apart, and two international championships; the Sudamericana and the CONCACAF Champions' Cup. By winning the league title Pachuca qualified to the 2008 Champions' Cup in a bid to defend their title, which they did successfully by defeating Saprissa in the finals in April, and later secured a berth for the 2008 FIFA Club World Cup in December 2008, where they were knocked out by 2008 Copa Libertadores champions L.D.U. Quito after losing 2–0. 

On July 31, 2007, Pachuca entered into a club-to-club partnership with the Colorado Rapids of the MLS. The alliance included a home-and-home annual series between the clubs, an exchange of best business practices, and the establishment of the Tuzos Soccer Academy at Dick's Sporting Goods Park, which was officially launched on October 1, 2007. The move established the Rapids as Pachuca's official partner club in the United States, in a move designed for promotion of both on field development, player exchanges, and business incentives for both clubs on either side of the border.

In August 2007, the club won the North American SuperLiga trophy, a tournament between teams from Liga MX and MLS. Pachuca beat the Los Angeles Galaxy on penalties (4–3) after tying 1–1 at the end of extra time. Shortly after, CONCACAF named Pachuca as the 2007 Team of the Year for their 5 titles in 17 months, which were the 2006 Clausura title, the Copa Sudamericana title, the CONCACAF Champions Cup, the 2007 Clausura, and the North American SuperLiga. With the CONCACAF Champions Cup title, Pachuca claimed a spot in the 2007 FIFA Club World Cup, where they had a disappointing performance, being knocked out by their first rival in the tournament, CAF champions Étoile Sportive du Sahel from Tunisia.

Pachuca made it to the Clausura 2009 Finals, losing to Pumas UNAM. In April 2010, Pachuca clinched their fourth CONCACAF Champions League title after defeating Cruz Azul on away goals, and secured a berth for the 2010 FIFA Club World Cup, where they were knocked out by CAF Champions and eventual CWC runner-ups TP Mazembe. During the Bicentenario 2010 tournament, Pachuca made it to the semi-finals with a 2–2 draw at Estadio Hidalgo, and then losing 1–0 in Toluca, eventually losing 3–2 on aggregate.

In the 2016 Clausura, Pachuca eliminated Santos Laguna and Club León in the playoffs before beating Rayados in the finals 2–1, to win their sixth league title. In 2017, Pachuca won their fifth Champions League title, defeating Tigres UANL in the finals 2–1. With this victory, they secured a spot in the 2017 FIFA Club World Cup, where they had a respectable performance, defeating Al Jazira 4–1 in the third place match.

Historic table in Primera Division

Club records

Kit evolution and rare kits
 Home kit: White shirt with navy blue stripes.
 Away kit: black shirt with Orange stripes.

Home

First kit evolution

Away

First kit evolution

Shirt sponsors and manufacturers

Personnel

Management

Coaching staff

Players

First-team squad

Out on loan

Reserve teams

Pachuca Premier
Reserve team that plays in the Liga Premier in the third level of the Mexican league system. 

Tuzos Pachuca
Reserve team that plays in the Liga TDP, the fourth level of the Mexican league system.

Pachuca
Reserve team that plays in the Liga TDP, the fourth level of the Mexican league system.

Aragón F.C.
Reserve team that plays in the Liga TDP, the fourth level of the Mexican league system.

Liga MX scoring leaders

Most appearances

Honours

National

Professional era
Primera División / Liga MX: 7
Invierno 1999, Invierno 2001, Apertura 2003, Clausura 2006, Clausura 2007, Clausura 2016, Apertura 2022  
  Ascenso MX: 2
1995–96, Invierno 1997
  Segunda División: 2
1966–67, 1991–92
 Campeón de Ascenso: 1
Final de Ascenso 1997–98
 Segunda División de México Cup: 1
1965–66
 Segunda División B de México: 1
1987–88

Amateur era
 Campeonato del Distrito Federal: 3
1904–05, 1917–18, 1919–20
Copa Tower: 2
1907–08, 1911–12

International
CONCACAF Champions' Cup / Champions League: 5
2002, 2007, 2008, 2009–10, 2016–17
FIFA Club World Cup: 
3rd Place – 2017
Copa Sudamericana: 1
2006
North American SuperLiga: 1
2007

Other/friendly

Copa Pachuca: 5
2000, 2004, 2009, 2011, 2014
 Carlsberg Cup: 1
2008
 Copa Amistad: 1
2008
 Copa Durango 450: 1
2013

References

External links

 

 
Football clubs in Hidalgo (state)
Association football clubs established in 1901
Pachuca
Liga MX teams
1901 establishments in Mexico
Ascenso MX teams
Primera Fuerza teams
Mining association football teams
P
P